Alfredo Galán Sotillo (born 5 April 1978) is a Spanish serial killer who killed six people and wounded three from 4 January - 18 March 2003.

Early life
Alfredo Galán was born in Puertollano, province of Ciudad Real, Castile-La Mancha, Spain. Galán became class president in high school, but was remembered as unremarkable and introverted. In September 1998, he joined the Spanish Army and became a corporal in the 31st Mech Regiment "Asturias" of Madrid and participated in humanitarian missions in Bosnia. He was sent back to Spain to help deal with the clean up of the Prestige oil spill. Galán stole a car and was sent to the Gómez Ulla Military Hospital in Madrid. He was diagnosed with neurosis and anxiety and continued drinking. In March 2003, he began working as a security guard at Madrid–Barajas Airport.

Murders
On 24 January 2003, Galán shot 50-year-old Juan Francisco Ledesma in the head in front of his 2-year-old son. On 5 February, the body of 28-year-old airport cleaner Juan Carlos Martín Estacio was found shot in the head. An ace of clubs was left nearby. On 7 March 2003, 27-year-old Santiago Eduardo Salas was shot in the face by Galán, but survived. Salas's friend, 29-year-old Anahid Castillo Ruperti, was able to escape unharmed. A three of cups was dropped at the scene. It was not originally his intention for playing cards to be his "signature". He only began leaving cards after the media sensationalized the fact that a card had been found by a victim's body.

Aftermath
On 3 July 2003, Galán surrendered at a police station and confessed to being "The Playing Card Killer." It was reported that in some of the murders, Galán had wished his victims good morning and ordered them to kneel before shooting them. He had smuggled the gun into Spain by hiding it in a television set.

He was sentenced to 142 years and three months in prison.

See also
List of serial killers by country
Koko (novel)

References

1978 births
2003 murders in Spain
21st-century criminals
Living people
Male serial killers
People convicted of murder by Spain
People from Puertollano
Prisoners sentenced to life imprisonment by Spain
Security guards convicted of crimes
Spanish people convicted of murder
Spanish serial killers
Spanish soldiers